The flag of the Community of Madrid is crimson red, with seven five-pointed stars in silver, placed four and three in the centre of the field.

The crimson color stands for Castile as Madrid has been historically Castillian, and the stars represents each of the administrative areas of the province of Madrid, which are the City of Madrid, Alcalá de Henares, Torrelaguna, San Martín de Valdeiglesias, El Escorial, Getafe and Chinchón. The stars are also thought to represent either the Ursa Major (The Plough asterism) or Ursa Minor constellation, in reference to the bear of the City of Madrid's coat of arms.

See also
Flags of the autonomous communities of Spain
Coat of arms of the Community of Madrid

References

External links
"El escudo y la bandera". Book by Santiago Amón

1983 establishments in the Community of Madrid
Flags introduced in 1983
Flags of Spain
Flag
Flag
Red and white flags